Sir Francis Wyatt (1588–1644) was an English nobleman, knight, politician, and government official. He was the first English royal governor of Virginia. He sailed for America on 1 August 1621 on board the George. He became governor shortly after his arrival in October, taking with him the first written constitution for an English colony. Also sailing with him on this voyage was his second cousin Henry Fleete Sr., who helped found colonies in both Virginia and Maryland. In 1622 he rallied the defence of Jamestown which was attacked by Native Americans, during which the lives of some 400 settlers were lost and he then oversaw the contraction of the colony from scattered outposts into a defensive core.

Life 
Francis was the son of Sir George Wyatt and his wife Jane Finch. He was born at Boxley Manor in Kent, and attended St Mary Hall, Oxford, (from 1 July 1603) and Gray's Inn (1604). He was knighted on 7 July 1618 at Windsor.

Wyatt was governor of Virginia from November 1621. Virginia became a royal colony in 1624, but Sir Francis, at the request of the crown, remained on as governor until 18 September 1625, when Sir George Yeardley, whom he had succeeded, resumed the office. In 1624, Wyatt resided in Jamestown with his wife, his brother Haute, and seventeen servants. In 1625, he received a black servant girl after a court settlement from her previous employer. 

After leaving office, he left Virginia for Ireland and England to settle his father's estate. He was appointed governor again in 1639, sailing from England to take up his post. He served from November 1639 until February 1641 and was then succeeded by Sir William Berkeley. He arranged the purchase of the home of the previous governor to use as the first designated "state house" of the colony, the government previously having met in the church.

Wyatt returned to England after his second term as governor and died in Boxley. He was buried there on 24 August 1644.

Sir Francis Wyatt organized the General Assembly which had been called in 1619. This was the first legislative body in America. Sir Francis caused its privileges to be embodied in a written constitution, the first of its kind in the New World.

Family
Francis Wyatt's grandfather was Sir Thomas Wyatt the younger, who had led the Kent faction of Wyatt's rebellion to the Spanish marriage of Queen Mary in support of Lady Elizabeth, and was executed for treason as a result. His great-grandfather Thomas Wyatt the elder, the poet, was briefly imprisoned in the Tower of London for an alleged relationship with Anne Boleyn.

Sir Francis's wife, Lady Margaret, was the daughter of Sir Samuel Sandys and the niece of George Sandys, the treasurer of Jamestown. Francis and Margaret's children included Henry (whose daughter Frances briefly held Boxley); Francis (who was at King's College, Cambridge, in 1639); Edwin (an MP who successfully sued his niece to regain Boxley, but whose son died without issue); and Elizabeth (grandmother of Robert Marsham, 1st Baron Romney (1685–1724), who eventually inherited Boxley). Boxley remained with the barons and earls of Romney for more than two hundred years.

His younger brother, the Reverend Hawte Wyatt (1594–1638), who was the rector of Maidstone, Kent, travelled to Virginia with Francis in 1621 and returned with him to England in 1624 after their father died. Rev. Wyatt's many descendants in America include the late Duchess of Windsor, wife of Edward VIII, later the Duke of Windsor.

References

Colonial governors of Virginia
1588 births
1644 deaths
People from Jamestown, Virginia
Alumni of St Mary Hall, Oxford
Members of Gray's Inn
English emigrants